Großharrie is a municipality in the district of Plön, in Schleswig-Holstein, Germany. The village is located about 10 kilometers north east of Neumünster close to the Dosenmoor.

References

External links

Plön (district)